Lists of games on Nintendo consoles covers video games provided by Nintendo. The lists include lists of games for home consoles, handheld consoles, hybrid and others.
For Nintendo games and other products, see List of Nintendo products.

Home consoles
List of Famicom games
List of Famicom Disk System games
List of Nintendo Entertainment System games
List of Super Nintendo Entertainment System games
List of Nintendo 64 games
List of GameCube games
List of Wii games
List of Wii U games

Handheld consoles
List of Game & Watch games
List of Game Boy games
List of Virtual Boy games
List of Game Boy Color games
List of Game Boy Advance games
List of Nintendo DS games
List of Nintendo 3DS games

Hybrid
List of Nintendo Switch games

Other
List of Super Game Boy games

Games
Video game lists by company